L&M is an American brand of cigarettes, currently owned and manufactured by Altria and Philip Morris International. The name comes from the tobacco company founded in 1873 called Liggett & Myers, predecessor of today's Liggett Group, in which L&M was originally produced.

History
L&M was launched in 1885 by Liggett & Myers as a brand of plug chewing tobacco. In 1952 or 1953, the first L&M cigarettes were created, and they were one of the earliest, perhaps the earliest brand to have a filter that was not one-sided. When L&M was launched, their motto was "American cigarettes of the highest quality with the best filter". When their success in the American market was solidified, Liggett Group made a proposal to take the brand international. In 1999, the L&M trademark rights were acquired by the largest tobacco company in the United States, Philip Morris, and are still produced by them today.

The brand is popular in Latin America, central and northern Europe, the Arab World, and the far east and south Asia. They were not very common in the continental US until a new roll out made them available in October 2007. According to the information of the independent agency of field investigation "Business Analytics", the second quarter of 2007, Phillip Morris brands took the first place in 25 Russian cities with a market share of 29.92%.

During a press conference, L&M was reported to have taken third place in the world by sales volume. Also, the L&M brand took second place among other cigarette brands produced by Phillip Morris International. Due to the labeling regulations in Europe banning the use of the word "lights", the names used to indicate the strength of the cigarettes had been changed, e.g., L&M Lights are now called L&M Blue Label. The same happened in 2010 in the U.S., when the Food and Drug Administration banned flavor descriptors—such as "mild," "light", and "ultra light",  though the color designations were already changed like in Europe.

In December 1997, the ingredients that go into L&M cigarettes were displayed on the cartons. In addition to blended tobacco and water, the 26 ingredients that go into L&M cigarettes include molasses, phenylacetic acid, and oil of patchouli.

L&M was the fourth-largest cigarette brand in the world, with 92 billion cigarettes produced in 2007. In 2016, L&M had a volume of 97 billion produced cigarettes. It is the third-best selling international cigarette brand outside the United States and China.

Marketing
Over the years, Liggett & Myers made many poster and magazine advertisements to promote the brand, which included famous slogans such as "No cigarette ever went so far so fast!". Hollywood celebrities such as Barbara Stanwyck, Rosalind Russell and Fredric March starred in various print advertisement to promote the brand by claiming that L&M filters were "Just what the doctor ordered!".

Various TV advertisements were also created. The most known ones were the "Just What The Doctor Ordered", "Live Modern", "Stay Fresh, Stay Fresh With L&M", and "Come on Over to the L&M Side" ads.

Markets
L&M cigarettes are sold in the United States, Mexico, Peru, Ireland, Dominican Republic, Brazil, Chile, Bolivia, Argentina, Luxembourg, Belgium, the Netherlands, Germany, Denmark, Sweden, Finland, France, Switzerland, Austria, Sultanate of Oman, Saudi Arabia, Portugal, Spain, Italy, Poland, India, Indonesia, Czech Republic, Romania, Moldova, Slovakia, Slovenia, Serbia, Bulgaria, Greece, Cyprus, Turkey, Albania, Estonia, Latvia, Lithuania, Belarus, Ukraine, Russia, Kazakhstan, Armenia, Georgia, Algeria, Libya, Egypt, Israel, Afghanistan, the United Arab Emirates, Thailand, Guatemala, Malaysia, Taiwan, Singapore, South Korea and Morocco.

Controversy

L&M and doctor-approved cigarettes
In the 1950s, L&M introduced an ad campaign called "Just What the Doctor Ordered!". This campaign came at the time L&M introduced the first filtered cigarette that became popular. In these L&M advertisements from the early 1950s, "just what the doctor ordered" had a double-meaning. Not only did it imply that L&M cigarettes were satisfying in that they offered both flavour and protection, but it also implied that doctors approved of the brand, a testament to the brand's healthfulness. In a typical advertisement that appeared in a February 1954 issue of Life, Hollywood star Fredric March made an assertion after having read the letter written by a "Dr. Darkis" that was inset into the advertisement. Darkis explained in this letter that L&M filters used a "highly purified alpha cellulose" that was "entirely harmless" and "effectively filtered the smoke".

Similar contemporaneous advertisements from Viceroy claimed that their filtered cigarettes were healthy because doctors recommended Viceroys to patients. Obviously, these ads claimed health benefits for filters, though filters actually did little to truly reduce the hazards of smoking. In fact, tobacco industry chemists were well aware that most filters actually removed no more tar and nicotine than would the same length of tobacco. However, a series of Reader's Digest articles worked to publicize these dubious health claims for filters in the 1950s.

One such article, entitled "How Harmful are Cigarettes?" (1950), noted that artificial filters took out some nicotine, since people were aware that nicotine was a killer. The article stated that silica-gel cartridges removed 60% of nicotine from cigarettes. This article spurred Viceroy to print advertisements a week later which read: "Reader's Digest tells why filtered cigarette smoke is better for your health." These health claims sparked a boom in Viceroy cigarette sales, as well as an onslaught of new filter cigarette brands flooding the market. Kent was introduced in 1952 with a filter made of treated asbestos on crepe paper. In 1953, L&M followed with a miracle tip, and Philip Morris advertised its diethylene glycol (Di-Gl) filter cigarette as the cigarette that took the fear out of smoking. In the next two years, Marlboro was re-released as a filter cigarette that targeted men (it had previously targeted women, with a beauty tip to protect the lips), and Winston was introduced with an advertising budget of $15 million.

Bulgarian Customs destroy counterfeit L&M cigarettes
On July 21, 2011, the Bulgarian customs authorities and Phillip Morris Bulgaria representatives organized the destruction of over 7 million counterfeit cigarettes bearing the mark L&M. The destroyed cigarettes were part of over 14.5 million cigarettes seized by the Bulgarian customs officials in September 2010 and February 2011 at the border checkpoints Kulata and Ilinden, southwestern Bulgaria. Bulgaria’s Customs Agency and Philip Morris Bulgaria had signed a co-operation agreement aimed at fighting the illicit trade of tobacco products. L&M cigarettes made 3% of all seized cigarettes in Bulgaria in 2010 and 9% of all seized cigarettes during the first five months of 2011.

Sponsorship

Motorsports 
L&M was the sponsor for Carl Haas Racing from the 1971 to the 1971 Can-Am seasons.

L&M sponsored one of the Ducati bikes that Ben Bostrom drove in 2001 and 2002. The company also sponsored the Derbi factory team competing in the 2001 Grand Prix motorcycle racing season on the 125-cc class.

Television shows
L&M, as well as Kellogg's, were the main sponsors of the Hotel de Paree television show from October 2, 1959, until June 3, 1960.

Gunsmoke was even advertised off-camera by Matt Dillon (James Arness) and Doc Adams (Milburn Stone).  L&M cigarettes also sponsored the radio version of "Gunsmoke".

See also
 Tobacco smoking

References

External links

 

Philip Morris brands
Liggett Group brands